Stuart Erwin (February 14, 1903 – December 21, 1967) was an American actor of stage, film, and television.

Early years
Erwin was born in Squaw Valley, Fresno County, California. He attended Porterville High School and the University of California.

Career
Erwin began acting in college in the 1920s, having first appeared on stage. From there, he acted in stock theater in Los Angeles.

Film career

He broke into films in 1928 in Mother Knows Best. In 1934, he was cast as Joe Palooka in the film Palooka. In 1932, he co-starred with Bing Crosby in the comedy The Big Broadcast, where he played Texas oil tycoon Leslie McWhinney. In 1936, he was cast in Pigskin Parade, for which he was nominated for the Academy Award for Best Supporting Actor. In 1940, he played Howie Newsome, the dairy delivery vendor, in the film adaptation of Our Town, based on the Thornton Wilder play.

In Walt Disney's Bambi, Erwin performed the voice of a tree squirrel.

Later, Erwin appeared in the Disney films Son of Flubber and The Misadventures of Merlin Jones.

Radio career
In 1946, Erwin starred in Phone Again Finnegan on CBS. He played an apartment house manager in the comedy-drama.

He also played various roles on Theater Guild on the Air, Lux Radio Theatre, The Old Gold Radio Theatre and Cavalcade of America.

Television career
In 1950, Erwin made the transition to television, in which he starred in Trouble with Father, which was retitled The Stu Erwin Show, with his co-star and real-life wife June Collyer. In 1963–1964, he played Otto King on The Greatest Show on Earth.

Erwin guest-starred on Crossroads, Angel, Bonanza, The Donna Reed Show, Straightaway, Gunsmoke and Our Man Higgins.

Erwin made four guest appearances on Perry Mason, including the role of murderer Clem P. "Sandy" Sandover in the 1962 episode "The Case of the Double-Entry Mind" and murderer Everett Stanton in the 1964 episode "The Case of the Scandalous Sculptor".

Erwin guest-starred on Father Knows Best in the episode titled "Family Contest" in the role of Mr. Hensley and on The Andy Griffith Show, season 1, episode 8, portraying Tom Silby who was presumed dead, but returned to town after a two-year absence.

Personal life
Erwin married actress June Collyer on July 22, 1931, in Yuma, Arizona.

Death
Erwin died of a heart attack on December 21, 1967 in Beverly Hills, Los Angeles, California, at age 64 and was interred at the Chapel of the Pines Crematory in Los Angeles.

Recognition
Erwin has a star at 6270 Hollywood Boulevard in the Television section of the Hollywood Walk of Fame. It was dedicated February 8, 1960.

Partial filmography

 Mother Knows Best (1928) - Ben
 New Year's Eve (1929) - Landlady's Son
 Speakeasy (1929) - Cy Williams
 Thru Different Eyes (1929) - Reporter
 The Exalted Flapper (1929) - Bimbo Mehaffey
 Dangerous Curves (1929) - Rotarian
 The Sophomore (1929) - Radio Broadcast Technician (uncredited)
 Happy Days (1929) - Jig
 The Cock-Eyed World (1929) - Buckley
 Sweetie (1929) - Axel Bronstrup
 The Trespasser (1929) - Reporter (uncredited)
 This Thing Called Love (1929) - Fred
 Men Without Women (1930) - Radioman Jenkins
 Young Eagles (1930) - Pudge Higgins
 Paramount on Parade (1930) - Marine (The Montmartre Girl)
 Dangerous Nan McGrew (1930) - Eustace Macy
 Love Among the Millionaires (1930) - Clicker Watson
 Playboy of Paris (1930) - Paul Michel
 Only Saps Work (1930) - Oscar
 Along Came Youth (1930) - Ambrose
 No Limit (1931) - Ole Olson
 Dude Ranch (1931) - Chester Carr
 Up Pops the Devil (1931) - Stranger
 The Magnificent Lie (1931) - Elmer Graham
 Working Girls (1931) - Pat Kelly
 Two Kinds of Women (1932) - Hauser
 Strangers in Love (1932) - Stan Kenney
 Misleading Lady (1932) - Boney
 Make Me a Star (1932) - Merton Gill
 The Big Broadcast (1932) - Leslie McWhinney
 Face in the Sky (1933) - Lucky
 The Crime of the Century (1933) - Dan McKee
 He Learned About Women (1933) - Peter Potter Kendall II
 Under the Tonto Rim (1933) - 'Tonto' Daily
 International House (1933) - Tommy Nash
 Hold Your Man (1933) - Al Simpson
 The Stranger's Return (1933) - Simon Bates
 Before Dawn (1933) - Dwight Wilson
 Day of Reckoning (1933) - Jerry
 Going Hollywood (1933) - Ernest P. Baker
 Palooka (1934) - Joe Palooka
 Viva Villa! (1934) - Jonny Sykes
 Bachelor Bait (1934) - Mr. William Watts
 The Party's Over (1934)
 Chained (1934) - John L. 'Johnnie' Smith
 Have a Heart (1934) - Gus Anderson
 The Band Plays On (1934) - Stuffy Wilson
 After Office Hours (1935) - Hank Parr
 Ceiling Zero (1936) - Texas Clarke
 Exclusive Story (1936) - Timothy Aloysius Higgins
 Absolute Quiet (1936) - 'Chubby' Rudd
 Women Are Trouble (1936) - Matt Casey
 All American Chump (1936) - Elmer Lamb
 Pigskin Parade (1936) - Amos Dodd
 Slim (1937) - Stumpy
 Dance Charlie Dance (1937) - Andrew 'Andy' Tucker
 Small Town Boy (1937) - Henry Armstrong
 Sunday Night at the Trocadero (1937)
 Second Honeymoon (1937) - Leo MacTavish
 I'll Take Romance (1937) - 'Pancho' Brown
 Checkers (1937) - Edgar Connell
 Mr. Boggs Steps Out (1938) - Oliver Boggs
 Three Blind Mice (1938) - Mike Brophy
 Passport Husband (1938) - Henry Cabot
 Back Door to Heaven (1939) - Jud Mason
 It Could Happen to You (1939) - Mackinley Winslow
 Hollywood Cavalcade (1939) - Pete Tinney
 The Honeymoon's Over (1939) - Donald Todd
 Our Town (1940) - Howie Newsome
 When the Daltons Rode (1940) - Ben Dalton
 A Little Bit of Heaven (1940) - Cotton
 Sandy Gets Her Man (1940) - Bill Kerry
 Cracked Nuts (1941) - Lawrence Trent
 The Bride Came C.O.D. (1941) - Tommy Keenan
 The Adventures of Martin Eden (1942) - Joe Dawson
 Drums of the Congo (1942) - Congo Jack
 Blondie for Victory (1942) - Pvt. Herschel Smith
 He Hired the Boss (1943) - Hubert Wilkins
 The Great Mike (1944) - Jay Spencer
 Pillow to Post (1945) - Captain Jack Ross
 Killer Dill (1947) - Johnny 'Killer' Dill
 Heaven Only Knows (1947) - Sheriff Matt Bodine
 Heading for Heaven (1947) - Henry Elkins
 Doctor Jim (1947) - Dr. James (Jim) Gateson
 Strike It Rich (1948) - Delbart Lane
 Father Is a Bachelor (1950) - Constable Pudge Barnham
 Main Street to Broadway (1953) - Stuart Erwin - First Nighter (uncredited)
 For the Love of Mike (1960) - Dr. Mills
 Son of Flubber (1963) - Coach Wilson
 The Misadventures of Merlin Jones (1964) - Police Captain Loomis

References

External links

1903 births
1967 deaths
American male film actors
American male stage actors
American male radio actors
American male television actors
Burials at Chapel of the Pines Crematory
People from Fresno County, California
Male actors from Los Angeles
20th-century American male actors